Azadeh Shirazi is an American surgeon and cosmetic dermatologist who has been featured on the DoctorsTV show for being the creator of the Eyeglow procedure. She has authored numerous peer-reviewed journal articles and is also invited on national and local news networks such as FoxNews, Cheddar, NewsMax, NBC, KUSI to discuss various medical topics, therapies, and aesthetic trends.

Education 
She received her medical doctorate degree from the University of Kentucky and dermatology at the Mayo Clinic and University of California San Diego as well as a Research Fellowship at the Wellman Center for Photomedicine at Harvard Medical School. She was trained at the Harvard University and the Southwestern Medical Center of the University of Texas.

References

Living people
American surgeons
American dermatologists
University of Kentucky alumni
Mayo Clinic people
Harvard Medical School alumni
University of Texas alumni
University of Texas Southwestern Medical Center alumni
Year of birth missing (living people)